Stjepan Lice is a Croatian jurist, poet, essayist and columnist for Kolo, Glas Koncila, Kana and other Croatian periodicals. Lice is one of the most popular contemporary Croatian Christian writers.

He collaborates with writers (Sonja Tomić, Ivanka Brađašević), historians (Vladimir Lončarević) and other influential Catholic intellectuals. Lice works as a secretary of the Faculty of Law, University of Zagreb. Lice is author of several scientific papers. He is a member of Secular Franciscan Order and collaborator for Croatian Catholic Radio and Radio Maria, as well as for Croatian Catholic Network and member of a Committee of the Croatian Radiotelevision.

Works 

(incomplete)
 Kako su rasli zemlja i nebo, Diocese of Đakovo, 1990
 Govor tišine, Durieux, 1992
 Dobra sreća, Kršćanska sadašnjost, 1993
 Govor tišine: ime nade, 1993
 Božić u orahovoj ljusci, Teovizija, 1994
 Djeca Betanija, Teovizija, 1995
 Ljudskost Božića: Božicńi razgovori s Bonaventurom Dudom, 1995 (co-author)
 Krist i naši svagdani: razgovori s Bonaventurom Dudom, 1996 (co-author)
 Otkriće blizine, Kršćanska sadašnjost, 1996
 Pohvala vedrini, Teovizija, 1996
 Znakovi prisutnosti: mala knjiga simbola, 1997
 Na putu bez odlaska, Kršćanska sadašnjost, 1998
 Litanije mojih svetih, Teovizija, 1999
 Nevidljive priče, 2000
 S dobrim vjetrom, 2003
 Tragovi dobrote, 2005
 Neka te sreća prati, Kršćanska sadašnjost, 2006
 Ozbiljnost nade, 2010
 Prostranije ogledalo, 2011
 Bubekovo gnijezdo, 2012
 Fra Zvjezdan: trag zahvalnosti, Teovizija, 2016
 Božićna blaženstva: zapisi i priče, Kršćanska sadašnjost, 2018

 Translated works 
 Dárek pro Ježíška'' (in Czech)

References

External links 

 Bibliography
 Stjepan Lice List of articles written for bitno.net

Living people
1954 births
Writers from Zagreb
Faculty of Law, University of Zagreb alumni
Croatian poets
Croatian essayists
Croatian columnists
Christian writers